Owl Studios is a jazz record label founded in Indianapolis, Indiana, in 2005. In 2013 the label was sold and renamed Owl Music Group.

History

Founding
Owl Studios was started in 2005 by Al Hall, an Indianapolis businessman, to promote local jazz musicians. He grew up playing trumpet in northern California and moved to Indianapolis in 1981. The label began as a basement studio for his sons. Hall said he intended Owl to be run differently from other labels. He said that usually a record label will pay for an album's recording costs, but the musician doesn't see much money until the label has recovered the additional cost of making and promoting the album. His plan was to have the label pay little or nothing in recording fees but immediately share revenue with musicians. He said that this approach gave an incentive for musicians to help promote their work.

Owl's roster includes Indianapolis saxophonist Rob Dixon, jam band Garaj Mahal led by Chicago guitarist Fareed Haque, and a new version of the Headhunters, a jazz fusion band active in 1970s that featured Herbie Hancock; drummer Mike Clark, vocalist Cynthia Layne, trumpeter Derrick Gardner, Indianapolis pianist and composer Steve Allee, clarinetist and saxophonist Frank Glover, the Busselli-Wallarab Jazz Orchestra; Chicago trumpeter Pharez Whitted, and New York City groups Bill Moring & Way Out East, and the Rick Germanson Trio.

Other projects
In 2009 Owl purchased the rights to the Indy Jazz Fest from the American Pianists Association and took ownership of the annual festival, turning it into a non-profit organization and a way to promote jazz in Indianapolis. The following year Owl started the  Emerging Jazz Artist Project to promote new musicians. The first release was the album Blocks (2011) by the Jeff McLaughlin Quartet.

Owl Music Group
In 2013 Owl Studios was sold to Kenny and Valerie Phelps and renamed Owl Music Group. Kenny Phelps is a drummer who toured with Dee Dee Bridgewater from 2012–2014.

Awards and honors
 Independent Music Awards, Echoes of Ethnicity by Derrick Gardner & The Jazz Prophets, 2010
 Independent Music Awards nomination, Best Jazz Album, Carnival of Soul by Mike Clark, 2011
 Independent Music Awards nomination, Best Jazz Album, Transient Journey by Pharez Whitted, 2011

Roster
 Bill Moring
 Buselli–Wallarab Jazz Orchestra
 Cynthia Layne
 Derrick Gardner
 Fareed Haque
 Frank Glover
 Garaj Mahal
 Mike Clark
 Monika Herzig
 Pharez Whitted
 Rick Germanson
 Rob Dixon
 Steve Allee
 The Dixon-Rhyne Project
 The Headhunters
 The Twin Cats
 Todd Harrold

References

External links
 Owl Music Group

Jazz record labels
American independent record labels
Record labels established in 2005